Rolf Johansson (born 21 July 1944) is a Swedish former Paralympic athlete.

References

External link
 

1944 births
Living people
Swedish male curlers
Swedish sledge hockey players
Swedish wheelchair curlers
Paralympic athletes of Sweden
Paralympic sledge hockey players of Sweden
Paralympic gold medalists for Sweden
Paralympic bronze medalists for Sweden
Paralympic silver medalists for Sweden
Paralympic medalists in athletics (track and field)
Paralympic medalists in ice sledge speed racing
Paralympic medalists in sledge hockey
Paralympic medalists in wheelchair basketball
Paralympic medalists in wheelchair curling
Athletes (track and field) at the 1972 Summer Paralympics
Athletes (track and field) at the 1976 Summer Paralympics
Athletes (track and field) at the 1980 Summer Paralympics
Athletes (track and field) at the 1984 Summer Paralympics
Athletes (track and field) at the 1988 Summer Paralympics
Ice sledge hockey players at the 1998 Winter Paralympics
Ice sledge hockey players at the 1994 Winter Paralympics
Ice sledge speed racers at the 1980 Winter Paralympics
Wheelchair basketball players at the 1984 Summer Paralympics
Wheelchair curlers at the 2006 Winter Paralympics
Medalists at the 1972 Summer Paralympics
Medalists at the 1976 Summer Paralympics
Medalists at the 1980 Summer Paralympics
Medalists at the 1984 Summer Paralympics
Medalists at the 1988 Summer Paralympics
Medalists at the 1980 Winter Paralympics
Medalists at the 1994 Winter Paralympics
Medalists at the 1998 Winter Paralympics
Medalists at the 2006 Winter Paralympics
Swedish wheelchair racers
20th-century Swedish people